"It Ain't My Fault" is the second single released from rapper Silkk the Shocker's second album, Charge It 2 da Game. Produced by Craig B., the song features a verse and chorus from label-mate Mystikal and samples the New Orleans jazz standard "It Ain't My Fault" written by Smokey Johnson and Wardell Quezergue. "It Ain't My Fault" was one of Silkk the Shocker's successful singles, making it to 18 on the Billboard Hot 100.

Production and release
The chorus of "It Ain't My Fault" samples the jazz song "It Ain't My Fault", which was written by Smokey Johnson and Wardell Quezergue in 1964. Introduced by Harold Dejan's Olympia Brass Band into the contemporary New Orleans brass band repertory, Johnson's and Quezergue's "It Ain't My Fault" has become a standard, recorded by the Treme Brass Band, the Preservation Hall Jazz Band and many others.

Critical reception
Soren Baker of the Los Angeles Times said about the "Part 2" version: "...Mystikal easily outperforms Silkk, who tries in vain to keep pace with his hyperactive label-mate."

Other versions
"It Ain't My Fault, Pt. 2," a remixed version of the track with the intonation, "Did I do that?" recalling Steve Urkel's famous catchphrase, later appeared on Silkk's third album, Made Man and was released as a single in 1999.

The chorus was re-interpreted in a charity song with the same name by Mos Def, Lenny Kravitz, Trombone Shorty, Tim Robbins, and the Preservation Hall Band to benefit Gulf Aid, a nonprofit created in response to the BP oil spill off the Louisiana Coast.

Mariah Carey recorded a reworked version of the song titled "Did I Do That?" for her 1999 album Rainbow.

Charts

References

1998 singles
Silkk the Shocker songs
Mystikal songs
Gangsta rap songs